Luiz Henrique Beserra dos Santos (born 19 April 1997), better known as Luiz Henrique, is a Brazilian professional footballer who plays as a midfielder for Brusque, on loan from the Portuguese club Moreirense.

Professional career
Henrique made his professional debut with Náutico in a 0-0 Campeonato Brasileiro Série B tie with Criciúma on 14 November 2017. On 11 July 2019, Henrique joined Moreirense in the Portuguese Primeira Liga.

For the 2023 season, Henrique joined Brusque on loan.

References

External links
 

1997 births
People from Maceió
Sportspeople from Alagoas
Living people
Brazilian footballers
Association football midfielders
Clube Náutico Capibaribe players
Esporte Clube Bahia players
Moreirense F.C. players
U.D. Oliveirense players
Centro Sportivo Alagoano players
Brusque Futebol Clube players
Campeonato Brasileiro Série A players
Campeonato Brasileiro Série B players
Campeonato Brasileiro Série C players
Campeonato Pernambucano players
Primeira Liga players
Liga Portugal 2 players
Brazilian expatriate footballers
Brazilian expatriate sportspeople in Portugal
Expatriate footballers in Portugal